{{Speciesbox
| image = Tropidurus hispidus.jpg
| status = LC
| status_system = IUCN3.1
| status_ref = <ref name="iucn status 11 November 2021">{{cite iucn |authors=Ines Hladki, A., Ramírez Pinilla, M., Renjifo, J., Urbina, N. & Hoogmoed, M.|date=2019 |title='Tropidurus hispidus |volume=2019|page=e.T49845495A49845504 |url=https://www.iucnredlist.org/species/49845495/49845504|access-date=16 December 2021}}</ref> 
| genus = Tropidurus
| species = hispidus
| authority = (Spix, 1825)
}}Tropidurus hispidus'', Peters's lava lizard or neotropical lava lizard, is a species of lizard of the Tropiduridae family. It is found in Brazil, Venezuela, Guyana, Suriname, and French Guiana.

References

Tropidurus
Reptiles described in 1825
Reptiles of Brazil
Reptiles of Venezuela
Reptiles of Guyana
Reptiles of Suriname]
Reptiles of French Guiana
Taxa named by Johann Baptist von Spix